Emily Luz Flores Castel (born 10 September 1990) is a Peruvian footballer who plays as an attacking midfielder for CD Universidad César Vallejo and the Peru women's national team.

International career
Flores made her senior debut for Peru in 2014. She played the 2014 Copa América Femenina and the 2019 Pan American Games.

International goals
Scores and results list Peru's goal tally first

References 

1990 births
Living people
Women's association football midfielders
Peruvian women's footballers
Footballers from Lima
Peru women's international footballers
Pan American Games competitors for Peru
Footballers at the 2019 Pan American Games
Club Universitario de Deportes footballers
Club Deportivo Universidad César Vallejo footballers